Rumenjan (also Romanized as Rūmenjān, Roomenjan, Rūmanjān, and Ruminjān; also known as Rūmījān) is a village in Barakuh Rural District, Jolgeh-e Mazhan District, Khusf County, South Khorasan Province, Iran. At the 2006 census, its population was 139, in 57 families.

References 

Populated places in Khusf County